Safia Tarzi was a pioneering Afghan fashion designer. She enjoyed international fame in the 1960s and 1970s. 

Safia Tarzi rose to fame in the 1960s, when she had her own fashion studio i Kabul. Her profession was a new one in Afghanistan. 

In the 1960s and 1970s, Afghanistan was undergoing a rapid modernization process under Mohammed Daoud Khan. Kabul was known as the "Paris of Central Asia", and women of the Urban middle- and upper classes had been dressing in Western fashion in public ever since queen Humaira Begum had appeared without a veil in 1959. This was encouraged by the government since it provided an image of modernity, and many women engaged in the new fashion industry in Kabul, where fashion shows were held attended by women of the royal family. Safia Tarzi was to become one of the most famed of the pioneering Afghan designers. 

Safia Tarzi was known for her characteristic feminized turbans and waistcoats.  In her design, she mixed traditional Afghan colorful embroidery, fabrics and furs with Western clothing models, and challenged traditional conceptions on what was considered masculine and feminine, urban and rural, Western and Oriental. 

She also enjoyed international fame. In 1969, Vogue selected Afghanistan as the location of a high fashion photo shoot, and made an editorial about Safia Tarzi.

References 

 Julie Billaud: Kabul Carnival: Gender Politics in Postwar Afghanistan
 Adenrele Awotona:  Rebuilding Afghanistan in Times of Crisis: A Global Response

20th-century Afghan women
Afghan fashion designers
Afghan women fashion designers